was a Japanese writer of short stories, novels, dramas and screenplays. He repeatedly collaborated on the films of director Kenji Mizoguchi.

Biography
Kawaguchi was born in the plebeian Asakusa district of Tokyo into an impoverished family. He was forced to leave home at the age of 14 to seek employment. He started to write in his spare time, while working at various jobs, which included working in a pawn shop, as a tailor, a policeman and as a postman at one point in his life. He came to be acquainted with author Kubota Mantaro, who encouraged him in his literary efforts.

Kawaguchi was arrested in Kamakura, Kanagawa in 1933, along with fellow literati Kume Masao and Satomi Ton for illegal card gambling.

In 1935, Kawaguchi won the first Naoki Prize for a short story titled Tsuruhachi Tsurujirō. He followed this with a serialized novel, Aizen Katsura, a melodramatic love story involving a nurse and a doctor, which ran from 1937–1938. The story became a tremendously popular bestseller and gained him considerable fame. It was later made into a movie starring Kinuyo Tanaka and Ken Uehara, and was the basis of numerous television series.

After World War II, Kawaguchi resumed his literary activity, publishing plays and novels. He won the Yoshikawa Eiji Prize for his novel Shigurejaya Oriku, a nostalgic series of episodes involving a prostitute who rose to become a brothel owner.

Many of Kawaguchi's novels were adapted to film, and he was long associated with Daiei Motion Picture Company. In 1965, he became a member of the Japan Academy of the Arts. He was awarded the Order of Culture by the Japanese government in 1973. His wife was the movie actress Aiko Mimasu, and his son was actor Hiroshi Kawaguchi.

Kawaguchi won the Yoshikawa Eiji Prize for his novel Shigurejaya Oriku, a nostalgic series of episodes involving a farm girl, sold to a brothel, who rose to become owner of a famous Tokyo teahouse. The story was eventually translated into English by Royall Tyler.

Selected works

Novels and short stories
 1934: Tsuruhachi Tsurujirō
 1937–38: Aizen Katsura
 1965: Nyonin Musashi
 1969: Shigurejaya Oriku

Screenplays
 1939: The Story of the Last Chrysanthemums
 1953: Ugetsu
 1953: A Geisha

References

Bibliography
 Kawaguchi, Matsutarō. Mistress Oriku: Stories from a Tokyo Teahouse. Tran, Royall Tyler. Tuttle Publishing (2007). 
 Wakashiro, Kiiko. Sora yori no koe: Watakushi no Kawaguchi Matsutaro. Bungei Shunju (1988).

External links
 J'Lit | Authors : Matsutaro Kawaguchi | Books from Japan 

1899 births
1985 deaths
People from Tokyo
Japanese writers
Japanese screenwriters
20th-century Japanese novelists
20th-century Japanese short story writers
20th-century Japanese male writers